Statistics of Swedish football Division 3 for the 2004 season.

League standings

Norra Norrland 2004

Mellersta Norrland 2004

Södra Norrland 2004

Norra Svealand 2004

Östra Svealand 2004

Västra Svealand 2004

Nordöstra Götaland 2004

Nordvästra Götaland 2004

Mellersta Götaland 2004

Sydöstra Götaland 2004

Sydvästra Götaland 2004

Södra Götaland 2004

Footnotes

References 

Swedish Football Division 3 seasons
4
Sweden
Sweden